Nicholas McCarthy may refer to:

Nicholas McCarthy (director), director and writer
Nicholas McCarthy (pianist), British pianist
Nick McCarthy (born 1974), musician

See also
Nick McCarthy (rugby union), Irish rugby union player